The Upper Galilee Regional Council (translit. Mo'atza Azorit HaGalil HaElyon) is a regional council in Israel's Upper Galilee region, bordered by the Mevo'ot HaHermon Regional Council and the Golan Regional Council, as well as a border with southern Lebanon.

The municipal area has a population of 15,500 and is headed by Giora Salz since December 2012, following 14 years by veteran Aharon Valenci. Its headquarters are located in Kiryat Shmona, an independent city not included in the council's jurisdiction.

Communities
The council consists of 29 kibbutzim:

External links

Official website 

 
Regional councils in Northern District (Israel)